Arda is a Russian heavy metal band that was formed in 2000 in Moscow, by vocalist Pavel Okunev (ex-Epidemia).

Band made its breakthrough releasing their debut album «О скитаниях вечных и о земле» (2004) and mini-album «Экзорцист» (2005), with popular songs Egzorcist, Taet sneg, Mrak, Pervaya zima, Net nikogo, Krilyataya tma, Radi zvezd and Tolyko pilj. In 2007 they released their next studio album called «Море исчезающих времён» followed by EP «В небо» in 2009 and 
EP «Холод» in 2010.
In 2011 Pavel Okunev changed all bandmembers and with new cast released full length albums "Там где земля становится морем" (2014) and "Северный Крест" (2017) and numerous singles and EP's: "Перерождение" (2011), "Полярная Звезда" (2013), "Мёртвая Вода" (2015) and "Экзорцист X" (2016)
At october 2017 band released their first acoustic EP "Не угаснет надежда" which consists of 3 songs recorded with violin, cellos and percussion.

Arda performed a huge number of concerts in Russia, the Baltic States and Belarus. Took part in biggest Russian openairs like "Taman", “Emmaus”, “Nashestvie”, "Slava Rossii", "Motoyaroslavets”, “NGFestival” and also supported bands like Papa Roach, Cradle of Filth, Sonic Syndicate in their Russian tours. ARDA appeared on air on various radio stations and recorded collaborations with the musicians of top Russian rock bands like «Аркона», «Louna», «Epidemia», « Black Obelisk», etc.
Also Pavel Okunev sang bonus track in the new “Elven Manuscript“ (Elfiyskaya Rukopis) – Russian most promoted rock-opera.

Band members

 Pavel Okunev - Lead vocals
 Mikhail Shaev - Guitar, back vocals
 Anton Ginsbourg - Bass guitar
 Karen Ter-Mesropyan - Guitar
 Den Zolotov - Drums

Discography

 О скитаниях вечных и о земле (2004)
 Экзорцист (2005)
 Море исчезающих времён (2007)
 В небо EP (2009)
 Холод EP (2010)
 перерождение Single (2011)
 Полярная звезда EP (2013)
 Там где земля становится морем (2014)
 Мертвая Вода Single (2015)
 Экзорцист X EP (2016)
 Северный Крест (2017)
 Не Угаснет Надежда (2017)

External links
 Официальный сайт группы Арда
 Official Youtube Channel
 Official Facebook Page
 Official VK page

Russian heavy metal musical groups
Musical groups established in 2000